Columbia Southern University is a private for-profit online university in Orange Beach, Alabama.

History
Columbia Southern University was founded in 1993 by Robert G. Mayes, Sr. The university developed its first degree programs in Environmental Engineering and Occupational Safety and Health in 1994.
By 1996 additional degree programs were developed and offered: The Bachelor of Science in Business Administration, followed by Computer Science, Criminal Justice Administration, and Health Administration.

Mayes headed the institution until his death in 2005, when his son, Robert Mayes, Jr., assumed the presidency. Ken Styron became president on May 1, 2018.

Students
The racial and ethnic makeup of the student body is 51% White, 21% unknown, 17% Black, 5% Hispanic, 3% two or more races, 2% Asian, 1% American Indian/Alaska Native, 0% Native Hawaiian/Pacific Islander, and 0% non-resident alien. More than 7000 students serve in the military.

Academics
Columbia Southern University consists of three colleges offering a total of 26 degrees at the associate, bachelor's, and master's levels, as well as 21 certificate programs online. CSU also offers a Doctor of Business Administration.

Accreditation
The university is accredited by the Southern Association of Colleges and Schools Commission on Colleges to award associate, baccalaureate, master’s and doctorate degrees, and certificates. It is also accredited by the Distance Education Accrediting Commission (DEAC).

Faculty and agreements with other institutions
Currently, Columbia Southern has more than 1,000 full-time faculty and staff. It enrolls and graduates thousands of students annually. Columbia Southern also offers online degrees through partnerships with Waldorf University. The university is one of approximately 140 schools approved to offer tuition assistance through the U.S. Army's centralized tuition assistance portal, GoArmyEd.

Student outcomes
Columbia Southern's 8-year graduation rate is 49 percent.  Median salary after completing ranges from $32,000 to $70,000.

References

External links
Official website

Distance education institutions based in the United States
Educational institutions established in 1993
For-profit universities and colleges in the United States
1993 establishments in Alabama
Distance Education Accreditation Commission